Soo Sunny Park is a Korean American artist. Park was originally from Seoul, South Korea, before she moved to the United States at the age of ten, and grew up in Marietta, Georgia and Orlando, Florida. She has both a B.F.A. in painting and sculpture, and a M.F.A. in sculpture, the first originating from Columbus College of Art and Design (Columbus, Ohio) and the latter from Cranbrook Academy of Art (Bloomfield Hills, Michigan.) After acquiring her degrees, she went on to obtain a residency at Skowhegan School of Painting and Sculpture circa 2000. She resides in New Hampshire, USA and teaches at Dartmouth College.

Awards  
Park has received several rewards and accolades for her work, including:
 “Best of 2001, Sculptor of St. Louis” River Front Times
 Joan Mitchell M.F.A Grant
 The 19th Annual Michigan Fine Arts Competition Grand Prize
 The Helen Foster Barnett Prize The National Academy Museum
 The Rockefeller Foundation Bellagio Center Fellowship

Exhibitions 
 Photo-kinetic Grid, You Are Here: Light, Color, and Sound Experiences exhibition, NC Museum of Art, 4/2018 
 BioLath, Currier Museum of Art, Manchester, NH 4/2017
 Luminous Muqarna, Islamic Arts Festival, 19th, Sharjah Art Museum, United Arab Emirates
 Unraveling Neon, in Sustaining Life Exhibition, Waterfall Mansion Gallery, 5th Floor, NYC, 9/2016
 Unwoven Light, Marshall M. Fredericks Sculpture Museum, MI, 10/2016
 Unwoven Light, Dennos Museum Center, Traverse City, MI, 6/2016
 Hybrid Objects, Abigail Ogilvy Gallery, Boston, MA, 6/2015
 Martin Shallenberger Artist-in-Residency and Silver Linings, Cheekwood Botanical Garden and Museum of Art, Nashville, TN, summer 2015
 Permanent Public Sculpture, Keelung Railway Station, Taiwan, 7/2015
 Lumière - Play of Brillants, curated by Light Collective, Éléphant Paname, Paris, France, 3/2015
 Boundary Conditions, New Britain Museum of American Art, New Britain, CT, spring, 2017
 Unwoven Light: Soo Sunny Park, Rice Gallery, Houston, TX, 4/2013
 Soo Sunny Park: Vapor Slide, Cranbrook Art Museum, Bloomfield Hills, MI, 11/2012
 New Art >> New Hampshire V, Thorne-Sagendorph Art Gallery, Keene, NH, 8/2012
 Permanent Collection, Nancy Margolis Gallery, NYC, 7/2012
 Capturing Resonance, DeCordova Sculpture Park and Museum, Lincoln, MA, 9/2011

References

Year of birth missing (living people)
Living people
Cranbrook Academy of Art alumni
Columbus College of Art and Design alumni
American people of South Korean descent
American artists
Skowhegan School of Painting and Sculpture alumni